South Lake is a lake by Atwell, New York and is the source of the South Branch Black River. South Lake is one of several lakes in Herkimer County that has a high acid content and is therefore not a big fish producer. The fish species present are brook trout and land-locked salmon. Boating is permitted. A canoe, rowboat or motorboat is needed to access the lake at the designated boat launch. The lake is a designated trout lake so no ice fishing is allowed. NOTE: The public is prohibited from trespassing on the private property exclusion areas around the camps. Private residents must use one of two designated gates to access the camps.

References 

Lakes of New York (state)
Herkimer County, New York